Eddy Bengtsson (born April 30, 1979, in Gothenburg) is a Swedish retired wrestler who competed in the Men's Greco-Roman 120 kg at the 2004 Summer Olympics and 2000 Summer Olympics. Bengtsson retired from wrestling and competed in many grappling tournaments, and also in mixed martial arts competition. On April 23, 2010, he faced Alexander Emelianenko for the Russian-based Pro FC mixed martial arts organization losing by KO in the opening round. Bengtsson made a brief comeback as a wrestler to try to reach the 2012 Summer Olympics but failed, On May 10, 2012, he officially announced his retirement as a wrestler. He is an honorary member of the Scandinavian Hammers.

Mixed martial arts record

|-
| Loss
|align=center|6–4
|Dmitry Poberezhets
|KO (punch)
| The Zone FC 11 - Survival
|
|align=center|1
|align=center|N/A
|Gothenburg, Sweden, Sweden
|
|-
| Win
|align=center|6–3
|Jay Mortimore
| Submission (smother choke)
| Cage Warriors Fight Night 6
|
|align=center|1
|align=center|2:46
|Isa Town, Bahrain
|
|-
| Win
|align=center|5–3
|Vasili Kachan
| Submission (guillotine choke)
| The Zone FC: Demolition 
|
|align=center|1
|align=center|0:33
|Gothenburg, Sweden
|
|-
| Loss
|align=center|4–3
|Dave Keeley
| KO (elbows)
| Cage Warriors: 45
|
|align=center|1
|align=center|4.40
|London, England
|
|-
| Win
|align=center|4–2
|Istvan Kalmar
| Submission (kimura)
| The Zone FC: Unbreakable 
|
|align=center|1
|align=center|0:50
|Gothenburg, Sweden
|
|-
| Loss
|align=center|3–2
|Alexander Emelianenko
| KO (punch)
| ProFC - Commonwealth Cup 2010
|
|align=center|1
|align=center|0:40
|Moscow, Russia
|
|-
|Loss
|align=center|3–1
|Alexey Oleynik
| Submission (strikes)
| IAFC Mayor's Cup 2009
|
|align=center|2
|align=center|2:20
|Novosibirsk, Russia
|
|-
|Win
|align=center|3–0
|Ivaylo Markov
| Submission (keylock)
| The Zone FC - Dynamite
|
|align=center|1
|align=center|1:58
|Gothenburg, Sweden
|
|-
|Win
|align=center|2–0
|Vladimir Kuchenko
| TKO (punches)
| The Zone FC - Dynamite
|
|align=center|1
|align=center|3:17
|Gothenburg, Sweden
|
|-
|Win
|align=center|1–0
|Andy Hillhouse
| TKO (punches)
| The Zone FC: Shockwave 
|
|align=center|1
|align=center|1:20
|Gothenburg, Sweden
||

See also
 List of male mixed martial artists

References

External links

 Professional MMA Record

1979 births
Living people
Sportspeople from Gothenburg
Wrestlers at the 2004 Summer Olympics
Olympic wrestlers of Sweden
Swedish male mixed martial artists
Heavyweight mixed martial artists
Mixed martial artists utilizing Greco-Roman wrestling
Wrestlers at the 2000 Summer Olympics
Swedish male sport wrestlers